The PE postcode area, also known as the Peterborough postcode area, is a group of 38 postcode districts in eastern England, which are subdivisions of 18 post towns. These cover most of Cambridgeshire (including Peterborough, Huntingdon, Chatteris, St. Neots, St Ives, March and Wisbech), much of south Lincolnshire (including Bourne, Stamford, Spalding, Boston, Skegness and Spilsby) and west Norfolk (including King's Lynn, Hunstanton, Sandringham, Swaffham and Downham Market), plus parts of east Northamptonshire and very small parts of Bedfordshire and Rutland.



Coverage
The approximate coverage of the postcode districts:

|-
! PE1
| PETERBOROUGH
| Peterborough, Dogsthorpe, Eastfield, Eastgate, Fengate, Newark, Parnwell
| Peterborough
|-
! PE2
| PETERBOROUGH
| Alwalton, Fletton, The Ortons, Stanground, Woodston
| Peterborough
|-
! PE3
| PETERBOROUGH
| Peterborough, Bretton, Longthorpe, Netherton, Ravensthorpe, Westwood
| Peterborough
|-
! PE4
| PETERBOROUGH
| Gunthorpe, Paston, Walton, Werrington
| Peterborough
|-
! PE5
| PETERBOROUGH
| Ailsworth, Castor, Sutton
| Peterborough
|-
! PE6
| PETERBOROUGH
| Baston, Crowland, The Deepings, Eye, Glinton, Langtoft, Northborough, Upton
| South Kesteven, Peterborough
|-
! PE7
| PETERBOROUGH
| Coates, Farcet, Folksworth, Hampton, Stilton, Yaxley, Whittlesey
| Peterborough, Huntingdonshire, Fenland
|-
! PE8
| PETERBOROUGH
| Achurch, Apethorpe, Armston, Ashton, Barnwell, Blatherwycke, Cotterstock, Elton, Fotheringhay, Hemington, Kings Cliffe, Lower Benefield, Luddington, Nassington, Oundle, Polebrook, Sibson, Southwick, Stibbington, Tansor, Thornhaugh, Thurning, Upper Benefield, Wadenhoe, Wansford, Warmington, Water Newton, Wigsthorpe, Wittering, Woodnewton, Yarwell
| North Northamptonshire, South Kesteven, Peterborough
|-
! PE9
| STAMFORD
| Stamford, Ashton, Aunby, Bainton, Barholm, Barnack, Braceborough, Careby, Carlby, Collyweston, Duddington, Essendine, Easton-on-the-Hill, Great Casterton, Greatford, Ketton, Little Casterton, Newstead, Pickworth, Pilsgate, Ryhall, Southorpe, Tallington, Tickencote, Tinwell, Tixover, Uffington, Ufford, Wilsthorpe, Wothorpe
| South Kesteven, Rutland, North Northamptonshire
|-
! PE10
| BOURNE
| Bourne, Bulby, Cawthorpe, Dowsby, Dunsby, Dyke, Edenham, Grimsthorpe, Haconby, Hanthorpe, Keisby, Kirkby Underwood, Lound, Manthorpe, Morton, Rippingale, Scottlethorpe, Stainfield, Thurlby, Toft, Twenty, Witham on the Hill
| South Kesteven
|-
! PE11
| SPALDING
| Spalding (most of), Deeping St. Nicholas, Donington, Gosberton, Hop Pole, Pinchbeck, Pode Hole, Quadring, Quadring Fen, Surfleet, Tongue End
| South Holland
|-
! PE12
| SPALDING
| Spalding (eastern outskirts), Cowbit, Gedney, Fleet, Holbeach, Holbeach Drove, Little Sutton, Long Sutton, Moulton, Sutton Bridge, Weston, Weston Hills, Whaplode
| South Holland, Fenland
|-
! PE13
| WISBECH
| Wisbech (most of), Guyhirn, Murrow, Parson Drove, Tydd St. Giles, Wisbech St. Mary
| Fenland, King's Lynn and West Norfolk
|-
! PE14
| WISBECH
| Wisbech (outskirts), Elm, Emneth, Emneth Hungate, Marshland St. James, Outwell, Terrington St. John, Tipps End, Upwell, Walpole Highway, Walpole St Peter, Walpole St Andrew, Walsoken, Welney, West Walton
| Fenland, King's Lynn and West Norfolk, East Cambridgeshire
|-
! PE15
| MARCH
| March, Benwick, Doddington, Manea, Wimblington
| Fenland
|-
! PE16
| CHATTERIS
| Chatteris, Swingbrow
| Fenland
|-
! PE19
| ST. NEOTS
| St Neots, Abbotsley, Buckden, Croxton, Diddington, Duloe, Eaton Ford, Eaton Socon, Eltisley, Eynesbury, Graveley, Great Paxton, Great Staughton, Hail Weston, Honeydon, Little Barford, Little Paxton, Offord Cluny, Southoe, Staploe, Toseland, Yelling
| Huntingdonshire, Bedford, South Cambridgeshire
|-
! PE20
| BOSTON
| Algarkirk, Amber Hill, Bicker, Brothertoft, Fosdyke, Frampton, Kirton, Sutterton, Swineshead, Wigtoft
| Boston
|-
! PE21
| BOSTON
| Boston, Fishtoft, Wyberton
| Boston
|-
! PE22
| BOSTON
| Benington, Butterwick, Carrington, Eastville, Freiston, Friskney, Frithville, Langrick, Leverton, Mareham-le-Fen, Moorby, New Bolingbroke, Old Leake, Revesby, Stickney, Wrangle
| Boston, East Lindsey
|-
! PE23
| SPILSBY
| Spilsby, Asgarby, Aswardby, Bag Enderby, Dalby, East Kirkby, Firsby, Halton Holegate, Harrington, Keal Cotes, Langton, Mavis Enderby, Monksthorpe, Partney, Sausthorpe, Somersby
| East Lindsey
|-
! PE24
| SKEGNESS
| Addlethorpe, Anderby, Anderby Creek, Ashington End, Bratoft, Burgh Le Marsh, Chapel St Leonards, Croft, Hogsthorpe, Orby, Wainfleet
| East Lindsey
|-
! PE25
| SKEGNESS
| Skegness, Croft, Ingoldmells, Roman Bank
| East Lindsey
|-
! PE26
| HUNTINGDON
| Huntingdon, Ramsey, Bury, Ramsey Mereside, Upwood
| Huntingdonshire
|-
! PE27
| ST. IVES
| St Ives, Holywell, Needingworth
| Huntingdonshire
|-
! PE28
| HUNTINGDON
| Abbots Ripton, Alconbury, Alconbury Weston, Barham, Bluntisham, Brampton, Broughton, Buckworth, Bythorn, Catworth, Colne, Coppingford, Covington, Earith, Easton, Ellington, Fenstanton, Glatton, Grafham, Great Gidding, Great Stukeley, Hamerton, Hartford, Hemingford Abbots, Hemingford Grey, Hilton, Houghton, Keyston, Kimbolton, Kings Ripton, Leighton Bromswold, Little Gidding, Little Stukeley, Lower Dean, Molesworth, Old Hurst, Old Weston, Perry, Pidley, Sawtry, Somersham, Spaldwick, Stow Longa, Tilbrook, Upper Dean, Warboys, Wennington, Winwick, Wistow, Woodhurst, Woodwalton, Woolley, Wyton
| Huntingdonshire, Bedford, South Cambridgeshire, East Cambridgeshire
|-
! PE29
| HUNTINGDON
| Huntingdon, Godmanchester, Hartford, Hinchingbrooke
| Huntingdonshire
|-
! PE30
| KING'S LYNN
| King's Lynn, North Wootton, South Wootton
| King's Lynn and West Norfolk
|-
! PE31
| KING'S LYNN
| Brancaster, Burnham Thorpe, Heacham, Snettisham, Wolferton, Burnham Market
| King's Lynn and West Norfolk
|-
! PE32
| KING'S LYNN
| East Lexham, East Winch, Leziate, Middleton, Mileham, Narborough
| King's Lynn and West Norfolk, Breckland
|-
! PE33
| KING'S LYNN
| Barton Bendish, Fincham, Gooderstone
| King's Lynn and West Norfolk, Breckland
|-
! PE34
| KING'S LYNN
| Clenchwarton, Islington, Stow Bardolph, Terrington St Clement, Tilney All Saints, Tilney St. Lawrence, Walpole Cross Keys, West Lynn, Wimbotsham
| King's Lynn and West Norfolk
|-
! PE35
| SANDRINGHAM
| Sandringham
| King's Lynn and West Norfolk
|-
! PE36
| HUNSTANTON
| Hunstanton, Holme, Ringstead, Sedgeford, Thornham
| King's Lynn and West Norfolk
|-
! PE37
| SWAFFHAM
| Swaffham, Beachamwell, Cockley Cley, Necton, North Pickenham, South Pickenham
| Breckland
|-
! PE38
| DOWNHAM MARKET
| Downham Market, Salters Lode
| King's Lynn and West Norfolk, East Cambridgeshire
|-
! style="background:#FFFFFF;"|PE99
| style="background:#FFFFFF;"|PETERBOROUGH
| style="background:#FFFFFF;"|
| style="background:#FFFFFF;"|non-geographic
|}

Map

See also
Postcode Address File
List of postcode areas in the United Kingdom

References

External links
Royal Mail's Postcode Address File
A quick introduction to Royal Mail's Postcode Address File (PAF)

Politics of Peterborough
Postcode areas covering the East of England
Postcode areas covering the East Midlands